Goodlow is a settlement in the Peace River Country of British Columbia, located west of Boundary Lake.

See also
List of communities in British Columbia

References

Settlements in British Columbia
Peace River Country